Barom Reachea may refer to:

 Barom Reachea I, Cambodian king who reigned from 1566 to 1576
 Barom Reachea II (1579–1599), Cambodian king ruled from 1597 to 1599
 Barom Reachea III (1566–1600), Cambodian king ruled briefly in 1600
 Barom Reachea V (1628–1672), Cambodian king reigned from 1658 to 1672
 Barom Reachea VII, Cambodian king who ruled from 1603 to 1618

See also 
 Borommarachathirat (disambiguation)